The Canadian Escarpment is part of the southernmost subrange of the Rocky Mountains, in the Las  Vegas, NM  area. It  straddles  the  boundary  between  the  High  Plains  and  Southern  Rocky  Mountain  physiographic  provinces, north of the Canadian River. The  elevation  of  the  area  ranges  from  about  6,400-6,800 ft; the mountains to the west attain elevations of 10,500 ft.

References 

Rocky Mountains
Geography of Las Vegas
Geography of New Mexico